The 2018 Vietnamese National Football Third League was the 14th season of the Vietnamese National Football Third League. The season began on 22 October 2018 and finished on 31 October 2018.

Rule 
In this season, there are 8 teams divided geographically to 2 groups with 4 teams per group. The winner of each group and the best runner-up of both group  promoted to Second League. The teams play each other once in a centralised venue.

Team changes 
The following teams have changed division since the 2017 season.

To Vietnamese Third League 
Relegated from Vietnamese Second League
 Sanatech Khánh Hòa (withdrew)
New entrants
 Bắc Ninh UPES
 Hà Nội C
 Hà Nội Phù Đổng
 PVF
 Bình Điền
 Hoàng Sang TP.HCM
 SHB Đà Nẵng B

From Vietnamese Third League 
Promoted to Vietnamese Second League
 Bà Rịa Vũng Tàu 
 Nam Định B
 Vĩnh Long
 Quảng Ngãi
Withdrew
 Sanatech Khánh Hòa
 Công An Nhân Dân B
 Kiên Giang

League table

Group A 
Matches played in Bắc Ninh and Hà Nội.

Group B 
All matches played in Hồ Chí Minh City.

Matches

Matchday 1

Group A

Group B

Matchday 2

Group A

Group B

Matchday 3

Group A

Group B

See also  
 2018 V.League 1
 2018 V.League 2
 2018 Vietnamese National Football Second League

References 

2018 in Vietnamese football